Russian State Archive of Literature and Art (or RGALI) is one of the largest state archives in Russia. It preserves documents of national literature, music, theatre, cinema, painting and architecture.

History 
As a centralized archive for documentation in the cultural sphere, RGALI was founded in 1941 under the name of TsGLA, on the basis of the collected manuscript holdings of the State Literary Museum (Goslitmuzei—GLM) and designated fonds from other museums and archives.

1941–1954 – Central State Literary Archive (TsGLA)
1954-VI.1992 – Central State Archive of Literature and Art of the USSR (TsGALI SSSR)
1992–present  – Russian State Archive of Literature and Art (RGALI)

External links
Official website 
Official website 
About RGALI 

Archives in Russia
Russia
State archives
Cultural heritage monuments of federal significance in Moscow